Pseudagrion nubicum, also known as the Bluetail Sprite, is a species of damselfly in the family Coenagrionidae. It is found in Benin, Botswana, Burkina Faso, Cameroon, Chad, the Democratic Republic of the Congo, Ivory Coast, Egypt, Ethiopia, Gambia, Ghana, Kenya, Malawi, Mali, Namibia, Niger, Nigeria, Senegal, Sierra Leone, Sudan, Tanzania, Togo, Uganda, Zambia, Zimbabwe, and possibly Burundi. Its natural habitats are swamps, freshwater lakes, intermittent freshwater lakes, freshwater marshes, and intermittent freshwater marshes.

References

Coenagrionidae
Insects described in 1876
Taxonomy articles created by Polbot